Patrayani is one of the Indian family names.

 Patrayani Narasimha Sastry (1872 - 1931) known as Saluru Pedaguruvu - eminent Indian Musical artist.
 Patrayani Seetharama Sastry (1900 - 1957) known as Saluru Chinaguruvu - eminent Indian Musical artist.
 Patrayani Sangeetha Rao famous Music director.

Indian surnames